James "Jimmy" Dunn (born ) is an English former professional rugby league footballer who played in the 1950s and 1960s. He played at club level for Leeds.

Club career
Jimmy Dunn made his début for Leeds, and scored 8-goals against Bramley at Barley Mow, Bramley on Saturday 20 October 1951.

References

External links

Search for "Dunn" at rugbyleagueproject.org

1933 births
Living people
English rugby league players
Leeds Rhinos players
Rugby league players from Leeds